Morais Santos Abreu (born July 10, 1968) is a beach volleyball player from Angola. 

He and team mate Emanuel Fernandes represented Angola at the 2008 Summer Olympics in Beijing, China.

References

External links
 
 Athlete bio at 2008 Olympics site

1968 births
Living people
Beach volleyball players at the 2008 Summer Olympics
Angolan beach volleyball players
Olympic beach volleyball players of Angola
Men's beach volleyball players